Houhere is the Māori language name for a genus of plants called Hoheria or lacebark, and may refer to the following plants from New Zealand:

Hoheria angustifolia, narrow-leaved houhere
Hoheria equitum, Poor Knight's houhere
Hoheria glabrata, mountain ribbonwood
Hoheria populnea, houhere
Hoheria sexstylosa, long-leaved lacebark